Blue Creek is a stream in the U.S. state of West Virginia.

Blue Creek was named for the blueish tint of its water.

See also
List of rivers of West Virginia

References

Rivers of Clay County, West Virginia
Rivers of Kanawha County, West Virginia
Rivers of West Virginia